Dadra  is one of the two talukas in Dadra and Nagar Haveli district, India. It is an enclave lying a few kilometres north of Nagar Haveli and is surrounded by Gujarat.

Dadra is located 6 km west of Silvassa, the capital of the district. Dadra consists of Dadra town and two other villages.

History
Until 1954, Dadra was part of Portuguese India. Under Portuguese rule, Dadra formed a freguesia (administrative parish) of the Nagar Haveli concelho (municipality). In turn, the Nagar Haveli concelho was part of the Daman district.

Demography
Dadra is a Census Town city in district of Dadra and Nagar Haveli, Dadra and Nagar Haveli. The Dadra Census Town has population of 13,039 of which 8,193 are males while 4,846 are females as per report released by Census India 2011.

Population of Children with age of 0-6 is 1639 which is 12.57% of total population of Dadra (CT). In Dadra Census Town, Female Sex Ratio is of 591 against state average of 774. Moreover, Child Sex Ratio in Dadra is around 935 compared to Dadra and Nagar Haveli state average of 926. Literacy rate of Dadra city is 90.51% higher than state average of 76.24%. In Dadra, Male literacy is around 94.53% while female literacy rate is 83.23%.

Dadra Census Town has total administration over 3,385 houses to which it supplies basic amenities like water and sewerage. It is also authorized to build roads within Census Town limits and impose taxes on properties coming under its jurisdiction.

References

Cities and towns in Dadra and Nagar Haveli
Enclaves and exclaves